The 2020 Parramatta Eels season was the 74th in the club's history. Coached by Brad Arthur and captained by Clinton Gutherson, they competed in the NRL's 2020 Telstra Premiership.

Summary
Parramatta started the 2020 season in fine form winning eight of their opening ten matches to sit first on the competition table. At the end of the 2020 regular season, Parramatta finished third, their best end to a season since 2005. In the qualifying final, Parramatta once again had to face Melbourne. After leading 12-0 early on in the game, Parramatta would lose 36-24. The following week in the elimination final, Parramatta went into half-time with a 18-8 lead over South Sydney but a second half capitulation which included Mitchell Moses missing a penalty goal directly in front of the posts which lead to a Souths try saw Parramatta lose 38-24 ending their season.

Standings

Fixtures

NRL Nines

Pre-season

Home and away season

Notes:
aFrom round 2 to round 4, all matches were played behind closed doors due to the COVID-19 pandemic.

Finals series

Players and staff
The playing squad and coaching staff of the Parramatta Eels for the 2020 NRL season as of 14 August 2020.

Transfers

In:

Out:

References 

Parramatta Eels seasons
Parramatta Eels season